Evelyn Frederick Charles Ludowyk (1906–1985), was a Sri Lankan Burgher Shakespearean scholar, author, playwright and critic, and the first Professor of English of the University of Ceylon.

Education 
A member of a prominent Dutch Burgher family, Ludowyk had his secondary education at Wesley College, Colombo and Richmond College, Galle. In 1922 he entered the Ceylon University College and obtained a First Class degree in English from the University of London. He was awarded a Government scholarship to study further at the University of Cambridge in 1929. While at Cambridge he was deeply influenced by I. A. Richards and F. R. Leavis. In 1936 he obtained his Doctor of Philosophy from the University of Cambridge, writing a dissertation on "English and English Education in Ceylon".

Academic career 
He returned to Ceylon from Cambridge in 1932 and was appointed a Lecturer in English at the Ceylon University College. In 1936 was appointed Professor of English. In 1940 he was also appointed Dean of the Faculty of Arts. When the University College was converted into the University of Ceylon, Ludowyk was appointed its first Professor of English in 1942. He was made the first Dean of Arts in the newly established University in Peradeniya in 1952. Among his students there was the linguistics lecturer and children's writer Chitra Fernando. In 1956 Ludowyk retired from the University of Ceylon and migrated to the United Kingdom.

Dramatist 
Ludowyk joined the University College Dramatic Society in 1922. Ludowyk produced a number of plays after returning from Cambridge. His most well-known production is the play "He Comes from Jaffna" which is still  staged in Sri Lanka today.  He was the producer of many of the productions by the University College Dramatic Society. He also collaborated with Ediriweera Sarachchandra to produce Kapuwa Kapothi, an adaptation of Nikolai Gogol's play "Marriage"  in 1945.

Personal life 
In 1940 he met and married Edith Gyömröi. In 1956, because the island's humid climate caused Edith problems, the couple moved to London. Later they settled in Colchester. Ludowyk died in Colchester in 1985.

Works
Books
 Marginal Comments (1945)
The Footprint of the Buddha (London, 1958)
 The Story of Ceylon (London, 1962)
 Understanding Shakespeare (Cambridge, 1962)
 The Modern History of Ceylon (London, 1966)
 Those Long Afternoons: Childhood in Colonial Ceylon (Colombo, 1989)

Plays
 He comes from Jaffna (1933)

References 

1906 births
1985 deaths
Alumni of Richmond College, Galle
Academic staff of the Ceylon University College
Academic staff of the University of Ceylon (Peradeniya)
Burgher academics
Burgher writers
Sri Lankan emigrants to the United Kingdom
Lanka Sama Samaja Party politicians
Sri Lankan dramatists and playwrights
20th-century Sri Lankan historians
20th-century dramatists and playwrights
Historians of Sri Lanka
Academics from Galle
People from Galle
People from Colombo